Old Greenville is a ghost town in Jefferson County, Mississippi, United States. The town was located along the old Natchez Trace and was once the largest town along the Trace. Nothing exists at the site today except the town's cemetery.

History
The area around Old Greenville was settled prior to 1798 and was originally known as Greenbay in honor of a local landowner, Henry Green. It was then known as Huntley, in honor of Abijah Hunt, who operated a store and the first cotton gin in Jefferson County in the area. In 1803, multiple landowners (including Ferdinand Claiborne), donated land that became part of the town of Greenville, named in honor of General Nathanael Greene. Old Greenville became the county seat of Jefferson County and remained the county seat until it was moved to Fayette in 1825.

Andrew Jackson married Rachel Jackson in 1791 at the home of Thomas Green near Old Greenville.

After being captured in 1803, the highwayman Samuel Mason was shot while trying to escape. Two of his gang members, Peter Alston and Wiley Harpe, attempted to bring his head in to claim the bounty that Governor William C. C. Claiborne had placed on Mason. Alston and Harpe were recognized, captured, and hung in Old Greenville.

Old Greenville was at one point home to a large number of men who would hold important roles in the future state of Mississippi.
David Hunt and George Poindexter both owned plantations near Old Greenville. Joseph Emory Davis, older brother of Jefferson Davis, practiced law in Old Greenville and Natchez. While his elder brother lived in Old Greenville, Jefferson Davis spent summers on his plantation. General Thomas Hinds spent a large part of his life in Old Greenville and died there in 1840.

The English travel writer Fortescue Cuming, visit Old Greenville in 1808 and wrote that the community consisted of forty houses (many unoccupied), a small church, courthouse, two stores, two taverns, drug store, a prison, and a pillory.

A post office operated under the name Greenville from 1803 to 1834.

Decline
After the county seat was moved, Old Greenville rapidly declined. By 1835, the main street was bordered by dilapidated houses and the town was practically abandoned.

The last remaining building in Old Greenville was the Cable Hotel, which burned prior to 1907.

Nothing remains of Old Greenville today except the Old Greenville Cemetery. A historical marker describing the community is located on Mississippi Highway 553 six miles west of U.S. Route 61.

References

Former populated places in Jefferson County, Mississippi
Natchez Trace
Ghost towns in Mississippi